Engelssky District is an administrative and municipal district (raion), one of the thirty-eight in Saratov Oblast, Russia. It is located in the center of the oblast. Its administrative center is the city of Engels (which is not administratively a part of the district). Population: 44,832 (2010 Census);

Administrative and municipal status
Within the framework of administrative divisions, Engelssky District is one of the thirty-eight in the oblast. The city of Engels serves as its administrative center, despite being incorporated separately as a city under oblast jurisdiction—an administrative unit with the status equal to that of the districts (and which, in addition to Engels, also includes four rural localities).

As a municipal division, the district is incorporated as Engelssky Municipal District, with Engels City Under Oblast Jurisdiction and two rural localities administratively subordinated to Engelssky District being incorporated within it as Engels Urban Settlement.

References

Notes

Sources

Districts of Saratov Oblast
